Dick Taverne, Baron Taverne,  (born 18 October 1928) is a British politician and life peer who served as Member of Parliament (MP) for Lincoln from 1962 to 1974. A member of the Liberal Democrats, he was a Labour MP until his deselection in 1972, following which he resigned his seat and won the subsequent by-election in 1973 as a Democratic Labour candidate.

Taverne's 1973 victory in Lincoln was short-lived; despite retaining his seat at the February 1974 general election, Labour regained the seat at the October 1974 general election, by the future cabinet minister Margaret Beckett. However, his success opened the possibility of a realignment on the left of British politics, which took shape in 1981 as the Social Democratic Party (SDP), which Taverne joined. He later joined the Liberal Democrats when the SDP merged with the Liberal Party. He has sat as a Liberal Democrat life peer since 1996.

Career
Educated at Charterhouse School, and then Balliol College, Oxford, he graduated in Philosophy and Ancient History, qualified as a barrister in 1954 and became a Queen's Counsel (QC) in 1965.

He unsuccessfully contested Putney as the Labour Party candidate at the 1959 general election, and was elected as the Member of Parliament (MP) for Lincoln at a by-election in March 1962.
Under Harold Wilson's premiership in the 1960s, he served as a Home Office Minister from 1966 to 1968, Minister of State at the Treasury from 1968 to 1969 and then as Financial Secretary to the Treasury from 1969 to 1970. In 1970, he helped to launch the Institute for Fiscal Studies, now an influential independent think tank and was the first Director, later chairman.<ref>{{cite book |last=Taverne|first=Dick|date=March 2014|title=Against the Tide:politics and beyond|page=201|url=http://www.ifs.org.uk/bundles/ifsabout/files/ifs_directors_reflections.pdf}}</ref>

In 1972 he was deselected by the Lincoln Constituency Labour Party, who disagreed with his pro-European Economic Community views. He then resigned from the Labour Party and from Parliament, and formed the Lincoln Democratic Labour Association. He was re-elected as an Independent Democratic Labour candidate at a by-election in March 1973, and held the seat at the February 1974 general election.

Taverne lost his seat in Parliament at the October 1974 general election. but he continued to remain active with the Democratic Labour Association until it folded after the 1979 general election. He was a leading social democratic thinker, publishing The Future of the Left: Lincoln and After in 1974.

When the Social Democratic Party (SDP) was formed in the early 1980s, he joined them, serving on their national committee from 1981 until 1987. He stood as an SDP candidate in the 1982 Peckham by-election, coming second with 32% of the vote, and in the 1983 general election, he stood in Dulwich, coming third with 22%. When the SDP merged with the Liberal Party he joined the new Liberal Democrats, serving on its Federal Policy Committee from 1989 until 1990. On 5 February 1996 he was created a life peer as Baron Taverne, of Pimlico in the City of Westminster, and sits in the House of Lords as a Liberal Democrat. In May 2006 he was an unsuccessful candidate for the Liberal Democrats in local elections to Westminster City Council in the Marylebone High Street ward.

In 1955, he married Janice Hennessey, a scientist. He became interested in science and public policy, and in 2002 founded Sense about Science, a charity with the objective of advancing public understanding of science and the evidence-based approach to scientific issues. He was elected President of the Research Defence Society in 2004. He was a member of the House of Lords Committee on the Use of Animals in Scientific Procedures, and is currently a member of the Science and Technology Committee of the House of Lords. He is the author of The March of Unreason, published by Oxford University Press in March 2005.

He is an Honorary Associate of the National Secular Society and a Distinguished Supporter of Humanists UK, as well as a vice-chair of the All Party Parliamentary Humanist Group. He is a former member of the Steering Committee of the Bilderberg Group. He won the Science Writers' Award as Parliamentary Science Communicator of the Year 2005. He is a listed member of Republic, the campaign for abolishing the monarchy.

On 15 September 2010, Taverne, along with 54 other public figures, signed an open letter published in The Guardian, stating their opposition to Pope Benedict XVI's state visit to the UK.

Taverne was interviewed in 2012 as part of The History of Parliament's oral history project.

In 2014 Taverne published his memoir, Against the Tide''.

Books

See also
List of UK minor party and independent MPs elected
Lincoln Democratic Labour Association
Candidate deselection (Labour Party)

References

External links

Lord Taverne profile at the site of Liberal Democrats
Profile on SourceWatch

1928 births
Living people
Alumni of Balliol College, Oxford
British humanists
British republicans
British secularists
Critics of alternative medicine
English barristers
English memoirists
Labour Party (UK) MPs for English constituencies
Liberal Democrats (UK) life peers
MEPs for the United Kingdom 1973–1979
Members of the Fabian Society
Members of the Steering Committee of the Bilderberg Group
Ministers in the Wilson governments, 1964–1970
People educated at Charterhouse School
Place of birth missing (living people)
Politics of Lincoln, England
Social Democratic Party (UK) parliamentary candidates
UK MPs 1959–1964
UK MPs 1964–1966
UK MPs 1966–1970
UK MPs 1970–1974
UK MPs 1974
Life peers created by Elizabeth II